William Louis Patterson (born July 20, 1987) is a former American football linebacker. Patterson played college football for the Indiana Hoosiers. Patterson signed with the Iowa Barnstormers of the Arena Football League (AFL) in 2012.

Early life
Patterson attended Lawrence North High School in Indianapolis, Indiana, where he was a standout member of the football and track and field programs.

Patterson committed to Indiana University on November 21, 2005. It was Patterson's only FBS scholarship offer.

College career

Statistics
Source:

References

External links
Indiana Bio

1987 births
Living people
African-American players of American football
American football linebackers
Houston Texans players
Indiana Hoosiers football players
Iowa Barnstormers players
Players of American football from Indianapolis
Virginia Destroyers players